Attack Squadron 65 (VA-65), nicknamed The World Famous Fighting Tigers, was an attack squadron of the United States Navy. The squadron was established as Torpedo Squadron VT-74 in 1945, redesignated as VA-2B in 1946, as VA-25 on 1 September 1948, and finally redesignated VA-65 on 1 July 1959. It was disestablished in 1993. Known as "The World Famous Fighting Tigers", VA-65 was one of the last medium attack squadrons to fly the A-6 Intruder and the A-1 Skyraider. It was the second squadron to be designated VA-65, the first VA-65 was redesignated from VA-6B on 27 July 1948 and would be redesignated as VA-25 on 1 July 1959.

History

The squadron had originally been established for the purpose of being part of the Midway Air Group.
July–August 1948: The squadron participated in operation CAMID III, close air support for amphibious landings. During this operation the squadron became the first VA unit in the Atlantic Fleet to fire Tiny Tim rockets.
1–20 June 1961: Following a four-hour notice for an emergency deployment, VA-65 deployed to the Caribbean Sea aboard  due to unsettled conditions in the Dominican Republic following the assassination of Rafael Trujillo.
19 October–6 December 1962: VA-65 was back at sea aboard Enterprise one week after returning from a Med cruise and headed for the Caribbean Sea due to the Cuban Missile Crisis. The squadron participated in the naval quarantine of Cuba.
31 July–3 October 1964: The squadron participated in Operation Sea Orbit as part of Carrier Air Wing Six aboard Enterprise. This operation was an around-the-world voyage of a task force composed of all nuclear powered ships.
15 Jun 1966: VA-65 conducted its first combat sortie during the Vietnam War flying from 
1 July 1966: VA-65's aircraft joined other Carrier Air Wing Fifteen aircraft in attacking and sinking three North Vietnamese patrol vessels that were approaching  at high speed.
25–31 October 1966: Due to the inclement weather, the squadron's all-weather A-6As flew 37 percent of all Yankee Team sorties against North Vietnam.
29 July 1967: VA-65 personnel were among those killed or injured during the USS Forrestal fire
May–June 1969: , with VA-65 aboard, relieved Enterprise in the Sea of Japan. Enterprise had been ordered to operate in the area as a result of the shoot down of a Navy EC-121 reconnaissance aircraft by the North Koreans. VA-65 conducted operations in the area during this two-month period.
7 October–3 November & 9–21 November 1973: After the outbreak of the Yom Kippur War, VA-65 operated from Independence in an area southwest of Crete and provided tanker support to fighter aircraft escorting Air Force One on Secretary of State Kissinger's mission to Israel as well as tanker support for A-4 Skyhawks being ferried to Israel from the United States.
4–22 August 1974: Independence, with VA-65 embarked, operated between Crete and Cyprus in response to the 1974 Cypriot coup d'état and the death of the American Ambassador to Cyprus at the hands of anti- American demonstrators.
November 1975: During the NATO exercise Ocean Safari in the North Atlantic, the squadron once again conducted cross deck operations with HMS Ark Royal.
15 April 1980: VA-65 deployed aboard  to the Indian Ocean after Iranians took the American Embassy personnel hostage.
22 December 1980: VA-65 returned from its deployment that included only one port visit of five days in duration and a total of 246 days at sea.
24 June 1982: VA-65 provided support during the evacuation of American and foreign civilians from Beirut, Lebanon.
7 March 1985: VA-65 and Dwight D. Eisenhower cut short a port visit to Palma, Spain and departed on a high speed transit to the Eastern Mediterranean due to the increased tension in Lebanon. The squadron operated in the vicinity of Lebanon until early April.
The concept was intended to reduce the number of personnel needed to support the squadrons.
29 September 1987: VA-65 deployed to the Mediterranean Sea aboard Coral Sea as the first Night Vision Goggle (NVG) capable A-6 squadron.
August–September 1989: Coral Sea, with VA-65 embarked, was ordered to operate off the coast of Lebanon following terrorist claims to have killed an American hostage, Lieutenant Colonel William R. Higgins, and the capture of Sheik Obeid from Lebanon by Israeli forces. The unstable situation in Lebanon ultimately led to the evacuation of the American Embassy. Squadron aircraft flew missions in support of the evacuation.
Squadron aircraft struck targets in Iraq, Iraqi forces in Kuwait, and Iraqi naval units. The squadron claimed the destruction (sinking) of 22 Iraqi naval vessels during the conflict.
April–May 1991: VA-65 participated in Operation Provide Comfort, flying close air support sorties over Northern Iraq in support of the 24th Marine Expeditionary Unit's mission to aid the Kurdish refugees in Iraq. On the final cruise, a "final checker" was sucked into an engine inlet, and was caught on the carrier close circuit TV. Subsequently, this video was shown on multiple TV video shows. The crew member survived, as his shoulder jammed into the "bullet" of the engine, and due to the quick thinking and training of the aircrew and deck crew, they were able to shut down before he was sucked down through the blades. His cranial and radio equipment were sucked in, and destroyed the engine. Later that night bandaged and bruised he appeared on the closed circuit TV station with the Roosevelts CO, and discussed his ordeal.
26 March 1993: The squadron held a disestablishment ceremony at NAS Oceana, it was officially disestablished on 31 March 1993.

Insignia and "The Beast" nickname
The squadron's first insignia was approved by CNO on 9 August 1945. During the time when the squadron's insignia was approved, VT-74 was flying the SB2C which was nicknamed "The Beast". Consequently, the squadron's insignia took on the shape of a beast riding a torpedo. There is no record of the colors used for this insignia.

After VT-74 was redesignated VA-2B, it continued to use the old insignia until 17 April 1947 when CNO approved a new insignia for the squadron. The insignia adopted by VA-2B reflected the squadron's new attack mission. The horsehead chess piece was designed to relate the squadron's power to that of a medieval knight and the fleur-de-lis represented integrity. Colors for the insignia were: a yellow background; red scroll with yellow lettering, black banner with a black and white pole; white knight with a yellow collar; a white lightning bolt; and the Fleur-de-lis was red with a black band.

The Knight insignia continued as the official insignia for the squadron following its redesignation to VA-25 on 1 September 1948. A new insignia for VA-25 was approved by CNO on 4 April 1950. The new insignia was a front view of a tiger on the prowl. Colors were: yellow background; brown tiger with green eyes, and white teeth, whiskers and claws; and a red tongue and mouth. When VA-25 was redesignated VA-65''' in 1959 the tiger insignia was retained and remained VA-65's insignia until its disestablishment.
Nickname: Tigers'' 1950–1993.

Home port assignments
Naval Auxiliary Air Field Otis, Camp Edwards, Massachusetts 1 May 1945
Naval Air Station Norfolk October 1945
Naval Auxiliary Air Field Charlestown February 1946
Naval Air Station Oceana June 1946
Coast Guard Air Station Elizabeth City 20 November 1950
Naval Auxiliary Air Station/Naval Air Station Oceana* 20 September 1951 NAAS Oceana was redesignated NAS Oceana on 1 April 1952.

Aircraft assignment
Curtiss SB2C-4E Helldiver May 1945
Curtiss SB2C-4E Helldiver July 1945
Curtiss SB2C-5 Helldiver February 1946
Grumman TBM-3E Avenger February 1946
Grumman SBW-5 Avenger 1946
North American SNJ-4 July 1947
Douglas AD-1 Skyraider July 1947
Douglas AD-4 Skyraider 1 December 1949
Douglas AD-6/A-1H Skyraider October 1953
Grumman A-6A Intruder March 1965
Grumman A-6B Intruder December 1968
Grumman KA-6D Intruder 1971
Grumman A-6E Intruder 3 May 1972

Major overseas deployments

Air Wing Assignments

 * CVG-74 was redesignated CVBG-1 on 15 November 1946.
 † CVBG-1 was redesignated CVG-2 on 1 September 1948.
 ‡ CVG-6’s tail code was changed from C to AF in the latter part of 1957. The effective date was most likely the beginning of FY 58 (1 July 1957).
 § CVG-6’s tailcode was changed from AF to AE sometime in the latter part of 1962. Carrier Air Groups (CVG) were redesignated Carrier Air Wings (CVW) on 20 December 1963, hence, CVG-6 became CVW-6.

Unit Awards

 * The award covers the competitive year 1948.
 † The award covers the competitive year 1967.

References

The Intruder Association
The Smithsonian Udvar-Hazy Center
The National Museum of Naval Aviation
Global Aircraft Site

See also

History of the United States Navy
List of Grumman A-6 Intruder operators
List of inactive United States Navy aircraft squadrons
List of United States Navy aircraft squadrons

FS0065
Military units and formations in Massachusetts
Attack squadrons of the United States Navy
Military units and formations disestablished in 1993
Military units and formations established in 1945